Seneca High School MCA (Magnet Career Academy) is a Louisville, Kentucky, USA,  public school.  It is located at 3510 Goldsmith Lane, Louisville, Kentucky 40220, in the Hikes Point neighborhood and is part of  Jefferson County Public Schools. Seneca is one of 15 Academies of Louisville schools in JCPS.

Academics
Seneca is a public senior high school with a full complement of academics including learning and academic disabilities education and English as a Second Language.  Seneca has an Honors program, an Advanced Placement program, a Competitive Music Program, an Urban AgriScience magnet program, and the Marine Corps Junior Reserve Officers Training Corps Program (JROTC). A professional career theme called Creating Our Global Community offers courses in human services, education, and international studies.
The foreign languages offered are French, Latin, Japanese, German, Spanish and Chinese. Students are now required to follow a dress code, although uniform is no longer enforced.

Athletics

Baseball
Basketball (boys and girls)
Bowling
Competitive Marching Band
Cross Country
Field Hockey
Football
Golf (boys and girls)
Soccer (boys and girls)
Softball
Tennis (boys and girls)
Volleyball (girls)
Wrestling
Archery

Administrators
Executive Principal: Michael Guy
Academy Principal: Nureka Dixon
Academy Principal: Ryan Fahey
Academy Principal: Jen Fuchs
Academy Principal: Rebecca Merkel

Notable alumni

Diane Sawyer – Television journalist for ABC News (1963)
Mike Redd - Basketball player. All-State three years and Kentucky Mr. Basketball in 1963 when Seneca won the Kentucky state championship. Led Kentucky Wesleyan to third in the 1964 NCAA Division II men's basketball tournament. Drafted in 1967 by the Boston Celtics. Won the AAU Men's National Basketball Championship in 1969 and 1970 with the U.S. Armed Forces All-Stars. Elected to the Kentucky High School Athletic Association Hall of Fame in 1999. (1963)
Jerry Abramson – Louisville, Kentucky mayor and Kentucky lieutenant governor.  (1964)
Wes Unseld – NBA basketball player for the Baltimore/Washington Bullets elected to the Basketball Hall of Fame in 1988. Led Seneca High School to two Kentucky state championships in 1963 and 1964. His 88 rebounds in the 1964 tournament, and 72 rebounds in the 1963 tourney, rank as the two top tournament marks in that category.  As a senior he was named Kentucky Mr. Basketball. Elected to Kentucky High School Athletic Association Hall of Fame in 1989. (1964)
Cyb (Priscilla) & Patricia Barnstable – Identical twin actresses who appeared as the Doublemint Twins in commercials for Wrigley chewing gum, portrayed Betty 1 and Betty 2 in the short lived 1970s television series, Quark, and co-host the Barnstable Brown Kentucky Derby Party, a celebrity charity event. (1969)
 J.J. Eubanks (born 1968) – basketball player, scored 101 points during an Israeli league game, was the top scorer in the 1994-95 Israel Basketball Premier League. (1985)
ZZ Packer – short-fiction writer and author of Drinking Coffee Elsewhere featured on the Today Show Book Club. (1990)
Garry Williams – Offensive lineman for the NFL Carolina Panthers and University of Kentucky. (2004)  
Doan Hoang – Director of Oh, Saigon, award-winning documentary about her family's separation during the fall of Saigon and her attempt to reunite them.  (1990)

See also
Public schools in Louisville, Kentucky

References

External links
School website
Redhawks Football
Fight Song Seneca Forever

Jefferson County Public Schools (Kentucky)
Educational institutions established in 1957
Public high schools in Kentucky
1957 establishments in Kentucky
Magnet schools in Kentucky
High schools in Louisville, Kentucky